In the Mix is an American television  series for young adults that covers a wide variety of critical issues and provides useful life skill information.

Format and themes
In the Mix is a series that airs on PBS kids for, by and with teenagers, young adults 14–21, and preschoolers too. Each half-hour single-theme episode typically includes several segments devoted to a serious issue facing youth, including school violence, mental illness, drugs, employment training, and interpersonal relationships. In addition, the programs are often co-hosted by celebrities.

All of the hosts and reporters featured on In the Mix are teens or young adults; several have gone on to careers in the fields of entertainment or journalism, including Jason Biggs, Kevin Jordan, Alimi Ballard, Nathan Marshall, and Eden Regal.

Current status
As of Spring 2016, In the Mix continues to be shown on select PBS stations, usually in educational blocks, and in Canada. The current catalog consists of 65 half-hour single-theme programs. All programs are available for purchase as DVDs, most with discussion guides and some with Spanish subtitles as an option. The programs are used in middle school through college, including teacher/counselor training.

Selected awards and honors

Emmy Awards
  Community Service Programming 
  Teen Special 
CINE Golden Eagle Award: 8

Academy of Television Arts & Sciences: Honor Roll of Quality Youth Programming

PRISM Awards: 3
 Ecstasy
 Drug Abuse
 Meth..Not Even Once

In addition, In the Mix has been recognized by several national educational and health organizations. The series won the National Mental Health Association's Media Award for its coverage of depression in teenagers. Various episodes of the show have also been included on the Young Adult Library Services Association's lists of selected videos.

Notes and references

External links 
 Official Web Site
 

1990s American children's television series
2000s American children's television series
2010s American children's television series
1991 American television series debuts
2012 American television series endings
American children's education television series
PBS Kids shows
PBS original programming